Acropora caroliniana is a species of acroporid coral that was first described by Nemenzo in 1976. The species is rated as vulnerable on the IUCN Red List, with a decreasing population. It is rare, but has been found over a large area, and two-thirds of the regions of Indonesia.

Description
Acropora caroliniana species form in thick horizontal structures, made of flat branches. It is light green, pale blue or white-brown in colour, and are also found on small branchlets. The species' radial corallites are small and "pocket-like". It looks similar to Acropora lokani and Acropora loripes.

Distribution
Acropora caroliniana is uncommon but found over a large area; Australia, western Pacific, the Indo-Pacific, Pohnpei, and Fiji in marine habitats. It occurs in two-thirds of the regions of Indonesia and also in Papua New Guinea.  It is threatened by the global reduction of coral reefs, the increase of temperature causing bleaching, disease, coral harvesting, climate change, fishing, human development, pollution, and being prey to starfish Acanthaster planci. It is sometimes found in Marine Protected Areas. It is listed as a vulnerable species on the IUCN Red List as the population is decreasing, and is listed under Appendix II of CITES.

Taxonomy
It was first described by F. Nemenzo in 1976 in the Philippines as Acropora caroliniana.

References

Acropora
Cnidarians of the Pacific Ocean
Cnidarians of the Indian Ocean
Fauna of the Red Sea
Marine fauna of Asia
Marine fauna of Oceania
Marine fauna of Southeast Asia
Marine fauna of Western Asia
Vulnerable fauna of Asia
Vulnerable fauna of Oceania
Animals described in 1976